The Patriotic Alliance for Change (APC) was a Paraguayan electoral alliance.

Its candidate in the 2008 election was Fernando Lugo, who won the election.

Composition
Its members included:

Febrerista Revolutionary Party
National Encounter Party
Party for a Country of Solidarity
Christian Democratic Party
Movement for Socialism
Broad Front
Former members, at the time of the 2008 election:
Authentic Radical Liberal Party
Progressive Democratic Party

References

Political party alliances in Paraguay
Fernando Lugo